A stunt is a difficult or unusual feat performed for film or theatre.

Stunt or Stunting may also refer to:
 Stunted growth or stunting, a primary manifestation of malnutrition in early childhood
 Stunt (botany), a plant disease that results in dwarfing and loss of vigor
 Stunt (group), a British dance music act
 Stunt (album), a 1998 album by Barenaked Ladies
 Stunts (album), by the indie rock band Rademacher
 Stunts (film), 1977
 Stunts (video game), a 1990 driving video game
 Stunt (gridiron football), an American Football defensive play
 Stunt (sport), similar to cheerleading
 Stunting (broadcasting), when a radio station abruptly begins broadcasting seemingly uncharacteristic programming
 Stunt Records, a record label
 Publicity stunt, a planned event designed to attract the public's attention to the promoters or their causes

See also 
Stunters, an emerging motorsport
Stunt actor
Stunt coordinator
Stunt team
Stunt double
Stunt performer
"Stunt 101", a G-Unit song
List of cheerleading stunts
Stuntman (disambiguation)